Jungle Bill is a song by Swiss electronic band Yello, released in 1992. It was released as the third single from Yello's seventh album Baby. The song was written by Yello members Boris Blank and Dieter Meier and appears on the band's compilation album Essential Yello.

Track listing 
7" single

Track listing 
12" single

Track listing 
CD single

Charts

References 

Yello songs
1992 songs
1992 singles
Boris Blank
Songs written by Dieter Meier
Smash Records singles
Mercury Records singles